Puget-Ville is a commune in the Var department in the Provence-Alpes-Côte d'Azur region in southeastern France.

Administration
Max Bastide was elected in 2001 and re-elected in 2008. In 2014, Catherine Altare was elected. She was re-elected in 2020.

Twins towns
 Roccaforte Mondovi in Italy
 Aleksandrów Łódzki in Poland

See also
Communes of the Var department

References

External links

  official web site of Puget Ville

Communes of Var (department)